John McTernan is an Australian actor, known for several theatre and television roles.

Biography

Early life
McTernan's career spans thirty years working in theatre, television and film.  He has appeared with all the major theatre companies and began his career training and then performing at the Ensemble Theatre in Sydney. He has appeared in several productions there, most recently Wrong Turn at Lungfish in 2008.  Previously at the Ensemble; Lovers, The Comedians, Boy Meets Girl, 6 Rms Riv Vu, Sonny and Same Difference.

Theatre
Work at the Melbourne Theatre Company includes Born Yesterday, Twelfth Night, Into the Woods, Assassins, The Glass Menagerie, The Real Thing, Serious Money, High Society, Art, Take Me Out and Boy Gets Girl.
The Nimrod Theatre Company: Young Mo, Volpone, Inside the Island, The Orestia, Clouds, Romeo and Juliet, Henry IV and Comedy of Errors.

Sydney Theatre Company: The Sunny South, The Venetian Twins, The Caucasian Chalk Circle.  Also for various other theatre companies: Sanctuary, Oleanna, What Did We Do Wrong among others.

McTernan is also well known for his work in music theatre with major stage roles in Grease, Godspell, Guys and Dolls, Sunset Boulevard, The History of Australia, Joseph and the Amazing Technicolour Dreamcoat, Shout, Into the Woods, and Assassins.  Also for The Production Company in Melbourne: She Loves Me, Gypsy and How to Succeed in Business Without Really Trying.

Film and TV roles
His work in film includes: The Brown Out Murders, the ABC feature Fuzzy, The Understudy and Evil Never Dies.

He is known to television audiences for roles in popular Australian drama series and soap operas. Long running series roles include: Cop Shop and G.P., for which he won Logie Awards. He played a gay man later revealed as a psychopathic blackmailer in soap opera Number 96 in 1977, and played a prison teacher in Prisoner in 1986. He played Lee Gordon in the mini series Shout! The Story of Johnny O'Keefe Other television roles include City Homicide, All Saints, Blue Heelers, Stingers, Something in the Air and Scooter Secret Agent.

Awards
McTernan won the 'Best Lead Actor' award in 1982 and 1983 at the Logies for his role in Cop Shop. For his role in G.P., he was nominated for Logies as Best Actor in 1990 and Outstanding Actor in 1991, and went on to win the Outstanding Actor award in 1992. He has also won a Green Room Award in 1987 for Best Supporting Actor as Feste in Twelfth Night for the Melbourne Theatre Company.

References

External links
 

Australian people of American descent
Australian male television actors
Living people
Logie Award winners
Year of birth missing (living people)